Kayunga is a town in the Central Region of Uganda. It is the main municipal, administrative, and commercial center of Kayunga District.

Location

The coordinates of the town are 0°42'12.0"N, 32°54'13.0"E (Latitude:0.703333; Longitude:32.903611).

Population
According to the last national population census of 2002, Kayunga town had a population of about 19,800. In 2010, the Uganda Bureau of Statistics (UBOS) estimated the population at 23,100. According to UBOS, the mid-year population was estimated at 23,600 in 2011. In 2014, the national population census put the population at 26,588.

In 2015 UBOS estimated the population of Kayunga Town at 27,400. In 2020, he population agency estimated the id-year population at 30,000 people. Of these, 15,600 (52 percent) were females and 14,400 (48 percent) were males. UBOS calculated the growth rate of Kayunga's population to average 1.8 percent every year, between 2015 and 2020.

Points of interest
The following points of interest are located within the town limits, or close to its edges:

The offices of Kayunga Town Council and Kayunga District Administration are located in the center of town. Also located here are the head office of Kayunga Journalists Association and the headquarters of Rural Initiative for Development and Empowerment (RIDE-UGANDA), a non-government organisation, as well as Kayunga Central Market.

In the middle of town, is the 200-bed Kayunga Regional Referral Hospital. The facility was renovated and expanded between 2018 and 2021, at a cost of USh70 billion (approx. US$20 million at that time).

The southern end of the Kayunga–Galiraya Road is located in the centre of town. Also, the western end of Kayunga–Busaana–Nabuganyi Road is located in Kayunga.

References

External links
Kayunga Hospital Upgraded To Regional Referral Hospital As of 29 December 2020.

Kayunga District
Populated places in Central Region, Uganda
Communities located on the Sezibwa River